Amir Yaron (born 1964) is an American-Israeli economist and governor of the Bank of Israel. He was announced as governor-designate of the bank by Prime Minister Benjamin Netanyahu on 9 October 2018. He was sworn into office on 24 December 2018 at the residence of Israel's president.

Early life
Amir Yaron was born in Israel in 1964. He grew up in Ramat Hasharon and Ramat Gan. He holds bachelor's and master's degrees from Tel Aviv University. He also holds a master's degree from the University of Chicago, received in 1992. He received a Ph.D from the University of Chicago in 1994.

Academic career
Yaron was assistant Professor of Economics and Finance at Carnegie Mellon University from 1994 until 1997. From 2009, he worked as Robert Morris Professor of Banking and Professor of Finance at The Wharton School at the University of Pennsylvania.

Governor of the Bank of Israel
On October 9, 2018, Yaron was chosen by Prime Minister Benjamin Netanyahu to be the next governor of the Bank of Israel, subject to governmental approval. He succeeded Karnit Flug, whose five-year tenure ended in November, 2018. Until he assumed office, Nadine Baudot-Trajtenberg served as acting governor from November 2018.

Other activities
 International Monetary Fund (IMF), Ex-Officio Member of the Board of Governors (since 2018)
 Aaron Dovrat Institute for Economic Policy at Herzliya Interdisciplinary Center, Member of the Board
 Foundation for the Advancement of Research in Financial Economics, President (since 2013)

Publications 
 2001 Eduardo Jallath, Tridas Mukhopadhyay, Sandra Slaughter and Amir Yaron: “The Economic Value of Network Externalities In an Electronic Payment Network: An Empirical Evaluation”
 2001 Ravi Bansal and Amir Yaron: “Growth Rate Dynamics and the Cost of Economic Fluctuations”
 2004 Ravi Bansal and Amir Yaron: “Risks for the Long Run: A Potential Resolution of Asset Pricing Puzzles”

References

Tel Aviv University alumni
Israeli economists
1964 births
Living people